Neobaryssinus is a genus of beetles in the family Cerambycidae, containing the following species:

 Neobaryssinus altissimus Berkov & Monne, 2010
 Neobaryssinus capixaba Monné & Delfino, 1980
 Neobaryssinus marianae (Martins & Monné, 1974)
 Neobaryssinus phalarus Monné & Martins, 1976

References

Acanthocinini